The HP Pavilion dv5 was a model series of laptop/mobile computers manufactured by Hewlett-Packard Company that features a 15.4" diagonal display. The HP Pavilion dv4 features a 14.1" and the HP Pavilion dv7 a 17" display. The dv5 series has been discontinued, being partially replaced by the dv6 (16") series, and released again as a 14.5" model in 2010.

Models

dv5se (Special Edition) - Features the Renewal Imprint finish
dv5t - Uses An Intel Processor
dv5z - Uses An AMD Processor

Weight And Dimensions

Note: Weight varies by configuration

Customizable Features
The following are customizable features only available in the United States (HP CTO Notebooks). Information retrieved on the HP store website, November 2008.

References
HP dv5tse Information webpage
HP dv5t Information webpage
HP dv5z Information webpage
HP dv5 14.5-Inch Edition, 2010

See also
 Hewlett-Packard
 HP Pavilion

Pavilion dv5